Mink Car is the eighth studio album by They Might Be Giants, released on September 11, 2001, on the Restless Records label.

One of the band's most eclectic efforts, its variety reflects its recording process; it was put together in a number of different studios, with a number of different guest artists and producers, around the country as the band toured between 1999 and 2001.

It runs the gamut from pure power-pop songs, such as "Bangs" and "Finished With Lies", to dance music ("Man, It's So Loud In Here"), and soft romantic ballads ("Another First Kiss").  "Man, It's So Loud in Here" was the only single released from the album, though its cover of the Georgie Fame oldie "Yeh Yeh" was featured in a Chrysler car commercial.  "Bangs," "Cyclops Rock," "Man, It's So Loud In Here," and "Another First Kiss", as well as "Boss of Me" (which was featured on non-U.S. releases), were released on the band's 2002 anthology compilation Dial-A-Song: 20 Years of They Might Be Giants.

"Bangs" provided the inspiration for author Zadie Smith's short story "The Girl with Bangs".

A complete cover album called Mink Car Cover was constructed in 2011 to raise funds for the FDNY Foundation in the wake of the tenth anniversary of the  terrorist attacks that occurred on the day of the album's original release. It featured covers by 19 different artists including Marian Call, The Doubleclicks, Hello, The Future!, and Molly Lewis.

Track listings
The track listing for the album varied depending on where it was released.  Some releases featured bonus tracks, such as Boss of Me for the Australian release, and Your Mom's Alright in Europe.

References

External links
 Mink Car at This Might Be A Wiki
 Mink Car Cover 10th anniversary cover compilation of the entire Mink Car album
 

2001 albums
They Might Be Giants albums
albums produced by Clive Langer
albums produced by Alan Winstanley
Albums produced by Pat Dillett
Restless Records albums